Stuart Nicholson may refer to:

Stuart Nicholson (footballer) (born 1987), English footballer
Stuart Nicholson (jazz historian) (born 1948), British jazz historian, biographer, music journalist, music critic, and academic
Stuart Nicholson (organist) (born 1975), English organist
Stuart Nicholson (Royal Navy officer) (1865–1936), Royal Navy officer who achieved the rank of Admiral
Stuart Nicholson (singer), English singer with the progressive rock band Galahad

See also
Wilmot Stuart Nicholson (1872–1947), Royal Navy officer who became Chief of the Submarine Service